Louis and the Good Book is a 1958 jazz and spirituals album by Louis Armstrong.

Singles included "I'll String Along with You" / "On My Way (Out on My Traveling Shoes)" 1959, also known as I'm On My Way.

Track listing
 "Nobody Knows the Trouble I've Seen" - 3:03
 "Shadrack" - 3:00	 
 "Go Down Moses" - 3:37	
 "Rock My Soul" - 3:12	 
 "Ezekiel Saw the Wheel" - 2:43	 
 "On My Way" - 3:05	
 "Down by the Riverside" - 3:13	
 "Swing Low, Sweet Chariot" - 3:10	 
 "Sometimes I Feel Like a Motherless Child" - 3:31	
 "Jonah and the Whale" - 2:50
 "Didn't It Rain" - 2:52	 
 "This Train" - 2:31
Extra tracks on CD reissue	
 "Sit Down, You're Rocking the Boat (With Sy Oliver Chorus)" - 3:18
 "That's What the Man Said (With Sy Oliver Chorus)" - 2:58
 "Going to Shout All Over God's Heaven (With The Decca Chorus Dir. By Lyn Murray)" - 2:49
 "Nobody Knows De Trouble I've Seen (With The Decca Chorus Dir. By Lyn Murray)" - 3:12
 "Jonah and the Whale (With The Decca Chorus Dir. By Lyn Murray)" - 2:49
 "Elder Eatmore's Sermon on Throwing Stones" - 4:22
 "Elder Eatmore's Sermon on Generosity" - 4:22

References

1958 albums
Louis Armstrong albums
Decca Records albums